Johann Zelebor (5 February 1815, in Eggenburg, Lower Austria – 19 February 1869, in Vienna) was an Austrian naturalist, illustrator, and zoologist.

Prior to 1845 he worked as a carpenter, afterwards serving as a taxidermist at the Naturalien-Cabinet in Vienna. In 1857 he became an assistant at the aforementioned institution, later receiving a promotion as a "curator-adjunct".

He took part in the expedition Reise der österreichischen Fregatte Novara um die Erde (1861–1876) ("Journey of the Austrian frigate Novara around the Earth, 1861 – 1876"). In addition to the Novara expedition, Zelebor took zoological journeys to the Balkans, Crete and Egypt during his career.

Works
 Zelebor, Johnann, August von Pelzeln, Franz Steindachner, and Rudolf Kner, Reise der österreichischen Fregatte Novara um die Erde (1861–1876 ("Journey of the Austrian frigate Novara around the Earth") Zoolologischer Thiel. Ester Band, (Wirbelthiere). 1. Säugethiere 2. Vögel 3. Reptilien 4. Amphibien 5. Fische, Hof- und Staatsdruckerei, Wien, 1869. [Volume 1]

See also
 European and American voyages of scientific exploration

References 

1819 births
1869 deaths
People from Eggenburg
Austrian zoologists
Austrian naturalists